Oriented structural straw board (OSSB) is an engineered board that is made by splitting straw and formed by adding formaldehyde-free adhesives and then hot compressing layers of straw in specific orientations. Research and development for OSSB panels began in the mid 1980s and was spearheaded by the Alberta Research Council, Canada (today AITF), which identified the straw strand manufacturing technology using formaldehyde-free (p-MDI) adhesives.

Uses

OSSB can replace wood oriented strand board (OSB) and particle board in structural and non-structural applications, such as interior and exterior walls for house construction, furniture and interior decoration.
 OSSB panels are formaldehyde-free, they are also used for applications where air quality is a concern, such as kindergartens, hospitals, bedrooms, and hotels.

Manufacturing
OSSB panel manufacturing starts with careful selection of straw fibres, which are then cut, cleaned, split and dried. Splitting straws allows resin to coat what would otherwise be the inside of a hollow straw.  Producing split straw of sufficient length was the key technical innovation making OSSBs possible.  OSSB is thus sometimes referred to as oriented split straw board.  Formaldehyde free resin is added to the straw and the fibres are oriented for strength and appearance, and shaped into a mat through directional mat forming. The mat is then pressed between heated belts, water is vaporized, transferring heat into the straw. The heat cures the adhesive and causes a series of physical and chemical changes to the pressurized raw materials, which harden the final product.

Properties
OSSB panels have high structural strength, load bearing and stability in both directions, as well as superior workability and excellent nail holding properties on all sides. Water permeability treated OSSB panels are more water resistant than treated traditional wood panel boards because they have no internal gaps or voids. OSSB panels are also highly earthquake resistant.
The resin used to manufacture OSSB is p-MDI, which does not emit volatile organic compounds (VOCs) and is formaldehyde-free. The raw material can be treated by various borate compounds, which are toxic to termites, beetles, molds, and fungi, but not to mammals in applied doses.

See also 
 Oriented strand board

References

Composite materials